Héctor Faubel Rojí (born 10 August 1983, in Llíria, Valencia, Spain) is a former professional motorcycle road racer.

Faubel has been racing full-time since 2002, always on Aprilia bikes. After finishing 2006 strongly he was considered a favourite for the 2007 125cc title, during which he battled with eventual world champion Gábor Talmácsi. For , he moved up to the 250cc class. However; his 2008 season was a disappointment, as Faubel could do no better than a fourteenth place overall, while teammate Álvaro Bautista was Championship runner-up.

For 2009, he leaves the Aspar team and goes to the Honda SAG team with the sponsorship of Valencia CF. In a season marked by the economic difficulties of the moment (in the midst of an economic crisis) that makes the means available to both the team and the pilot are rather scarce. Even so, the season is not bad for Faubel who arrives on the podium (second) in Le Mans and finishes the year in ninth position, signing the best season in 250cc for both him and the team he was playing for.

In 2010, The first season of the new Moto2 (600cc and "four-stroke") was a mystery for the whole grid. A dozen brands were running with different chassis to compete for being champions in the first season of the Moto2. Faubel meanwhile dragged the problems of the previous year and only a week before he managed to gain a foothold in the Marc VDS Racing Team led by Michael Bartholemy.

He only manages to finish four races at the points, so he finishes the World Cup in 26th position, having to leave in several races.

For 2011, he returns to the 125cc category, again with the Aspar Team.

He returns to the podium in several Grands prix, and even manages to re-savor a victory in the World Championship of Motorcycling at the German GP, with the anecdote that the Frenchman Johann Zarco entered on a par with him, but when Faubel did Fast return in less time than the Derbi driver, the commissioners awarded him the victory. The fifth year ended.

To the following season, 2012, the category of 125cc happens to be denominated Moto3, with the corresponding changes in the regulation. The bikes become 250cc and four stroke.

He fails to match the results of the previous season, and in addition to Bankia's lack of sponsorship in the Aspar team they decide to replace Faubel with Luca Amato from the Aragon GP.

He participated in the last Grand Prix of the season, the Valencia GP, in the Andalucía-JHK Laglisse team, to whom his teammate from season's beginning, Alberto Moncayo, also had jump over mid season in favor of Amato's compatriot Jonas Folger, from the season's piloting an FTR and finishing in fifth position, improving any other result obtained that same season.

Grand Prix motorcycle racing career

By season

Races by year
(key) (Races in bold indicate pole position)

References

External links

1983 births
Living people
Spanish motorcycle racers
People from Camp de Túria
Sportspeople from the Province of Valencia
125cc World Championship riders
250cc World Championship riders
Moto2 World Championship riders
Moto3 World Championship riders